The Birmingham Odeon is a cinema and former concert venue, located in Birmingham, England.

History
It originally opened in 1937 as the Paramount Theatre, featuring a seating capacity of 2,439. It was built on land made vacant by the removal of King Edward VI School to its new home in Edgbaston.

The cinema received its current name in 1942 after it was purchased by Oscar Deutsch's Odeon Cinemas chain. During the 1960s, 1970s and early to mid-1980s it was a very popular venue for concerts.
The Beatles performed here in 1964, as did The Who in 1971, Led Zeppelin and Emerson, Lake and Palmer in 1972, The Rolling Stones in 1973 and Queen (band) in 1975. The Ramones performed here in 1980. 
Iron Maiden performed here in 1980, 1981, 1982. In 1988 the auditorium was divided into six screens (with two further screens installed in other parts of the building during the early 1990s), ultimately forming an eight screen multiplex with an overall seating capacity of 1,732.

The rear aspect of the building occupies a striking position overlooking the railway tracks at the southeastern approach to New Street station.

References

Concert halls in England
Cinemas in the West Midlands (county)
Buildings and structures in Birmingham, West Midlands
Odeon Cinemas